Geversdorf is a village and a former municipality in the district of Cuxhaven, in Lower Saxony, Germany. Since 1 November 2016, it is part of the municipality Cadenberge.

Geversdorf belonged to the Prince-Archbishopric of Bremen, established in 1180. In 1648 the Prince-Archbishopric was transformed into the Duchy of Bremen, which was first ruled in personal union by the Swedish Crown – interrupted by a Danish occupation (1712-1715) – and from 1715 on by the Hanoverian Crown. The Kingdom of Hanover incorporated the Duchy in a real union and the Ducal territory became part of the new Stade Region, established in 1823.

References

Former municipalities in Lower Saxony